Hyporhamphus is a genus of halfbeaks. The species in this genus are distributed throughout the warmer seas of the world, most species being Indo-Pacific and there are some freshwater species.

Species
There are currently 37 recognized species in this genus:
 Hyporhamphus acutus (Günther, 1872)
 Hyporhamphus acutus acutus (Günther, 1872) (Pacific halfbeak)
 Hyporhamphus acutus pacificus (Steindachner, 1900) (Acute halfbeak)
 Hyporhamphus affinis (Günther, 1866) (Tropical halfbeak)
 Hyporhamphus australis (Steindachner, 1866) (Eastern sea garfish)
 Hyporhamphus balinensis (Bleeker, 1858) (Balinese garfish)
 Hyporhamphus brederi (Fernández-Yépez, 1948)
 Hyporhamphus capensis (Thominot, 1886) (Cape halfbeak)
 Hyporhamphus collettei Banford, 2010
 Hyporhamphus dussumieri (Valenciennes, 1847) (Dussumier's halfbeak)
 Hyporhamphus erythrorinchus (Lesueur, 1821)
 Hyporhamphus gamberur (Rüppell, 1837) (Red Sea halfbeak)
 Hyporhamphus gernaerti (Valenciennes, 1847)
 Hyporhamphus gilli Meek & Hildebrand, 1923 (Choelo halfbeak)
 Hyporhamphus ihi Phillipps, 1932 (New Zealand piper)
 Hyporhamphus improvisus (J. L. B. Smith, 1933) (Shortfin halfbeak)
 Hyporhamphus intermedius (Cantor, 1842) (Asian pencil halfbeak)
 Hyporhamphus limbatus (Valenciennes, 1847) (Congaturi halfbeak)
 Hyporhamphus meeki Banford & Collette, 1993 (American halfbeak)
 Hyporhamphus melanochir (Valenciennes, 1847) (Southern sea garfish)
 Hyporhamphus melanopterus Collette & Parin, 1978
 Hyporhamphus mexicanus Álvarez, 1959 (Mexican halfbeak)
 Hyporhamphus naos Banford & Collette, 2001 (Pacific silverstripe halfbeak)
 Hyporhamphus neglectissimus Parin, Collette & Shcherbachev, 1980 (Black-tipped garfish)
 Hyporhamphus neglectus (Bleeker, 1866)
 Hyporhamphus paucirastris Collette & Parin, 1978
 Hyporhamphus picarti (Valenciennes, 1847) (African halfbeak)
 Hyporhamphus quoyi (Valenciennes, 1847) (Quoy's garfish)
 Hyporhamphus regularis (Günther, 1866)
 Hyporhamphus regularis ardelio (Whitley, 1931) (Eastern river garfish)
 Hyporhamphus regularis regularis (Günther, 1866) (Western river garfish)
 Hyporhamphus roberti (Valenciennes, 1847)
 Hyporhamphus roberti hildebrandi D. S. Jordan & Evermann, 1927 (Central American halfbeak)
 Hyporhamphus roberti roberti (Valenciennes, 1847) (Slender halfbeak)
 Hyporhamphus rosae (D. S. Jordan & C. H. Gilbert, 1880) (California halfbeak)
 Hyporhamphus sajori (Temminck & Schlegel, 1846) (Japanese halfbeak)
 Hyporhamphus sindensis (Regan, 1905) (Sind halfbeak)
 Hyporhamphus snyderi Meek & Hildebrand, 1923 (Skipper halfbeak)
 Hyporhamphus taiwanensis Collette & J. X. Su, 1986
 Hyporhamphus unicuspis Collette & Parin, 1978 (Simpletooth halfbeak)
 Hyporhamphus unifasciatus (Ranzani, 1841) (Common halfbeak)
 Hyporhamphus xanthopterus (Valenciennes, 1847) (Red-tipped halfbeak)
 Hyporhamphus yuri Collette & Parin, 1978

References 

 
Hemiramphidae
Taxa named by Theodore Gill
Ray-finned fish genera